Bembidion debiliceps is a species of beetle in the family Carabidae. It is found in British Columbia, Canada and in both Oregon and Washington states.

References

Bousquet, Yves, and André Larochelle (1993). "Catalogue of the Geadephaga (Coleoptera: Trachypachidae, Rhysodidae, Carabidae including Cicindelini) of America North of Mexico". Memoirs of the Entomological Society of Canada, no. 167, 397.

Further reading

Arnett, R.H. Jr., and M. C. Thomas. (eds.). (2000). American Beetles, Volume I: Archostemata, Myxophaga, Adephaga, Polyphaga: Staphyliniformia. CRC Press
Arnett, Ross H. (2000). American Insects: A Handbook of the Insects of America North of Mexico. CRC Press.
Richard E. White. (1983). Peterson Field Guides: Beetles. Houghton Mifflin Company.

debiliceps
Beetles of North America
Beetles described in 1918